Hypochrysops epicurus, the dull jewel, is a butterfly of the family Lycaenidae found in Australia.

References

Luciini